Gialia Karfia (trans. Γυαλιά Καρφιά; Smashed) is the second album by Greek recording artist Katy Garbi.

It was released in April 1990 by CBS Records Greece, selling over 20,000 units. It includes her first hits "To Tzini", "Gialia Karfia" and "Fantasmataki", the latter two released also as video clips for further promotion by the local TV networks.

It was released on CD for the first time in 1992, under the Columbia label as a joint package with 1989's Prova. 
In 1996, the album was re-released  in a separate edition, as a part of the OK! Budget Price series Sony Music Greece launched at the time.

Track listing

Singles and Music videos
The following singles were officially released to radio stations and made into music videos, except the song "Psemataki".

 "Gialia Karfia" (Smashed)
 "To Tzini" (The Genie)
 "Fantasmataki" (Little Ghost)
 "Psemataki" (Little Lie)

Credits and Personnel

Personnel 
Ilias Achladiotis: keyboards, orchestration, programming (tracks: 2)

Katerina Adamantidou: backing vocals (tracks: 1, 2, 3, 5, 6, 7, 10)

Charis Andreadis: keyboards, orchestration (tracks: 1, 3, 4, 5, 6, 7, 8, 9, 10)

Dimitris Barbagalas: guitars (tracks: 1, 2, 3, 4, 5, 6, 7, 8, 9, 10)

Dimitris Bellos: programming (tracks: 1, 3, 4, 5, 6, 7, 8, 9, 10)

Stelios Goulielmos: backing vocals (tracks: 1, 2, 3, 5, 6, 7, 10)

Giannis Nikolaou: second vocal (tracks: 1)

Sandy Politi: backing vocals (tracks: 1, 2, 3, 5, 6, 7, 10)

Nikos Saragoudas: outi (tracks: 6)

Rigas Sariziotis: saxophone (tracks: 3, 7, 10)

Eva Tselidou: backing vocals (tracks: 1, 2, 3, 5, 6, 7, 10)

Stelios Zachariou: percussion (tracks: 6)

Production 
Sergios Charatzas (Digital studio): assistant engineer

Achilleas Charitos: hair styling, make up

Ntinos Diamantopoulos: photographer

Giannis Doulamis: executive producer

Kostas Giannakopoulos (Digital studio): mix engineer, sound engineer

Giannis Ioannidis (D.P.H.): mastering

Dimitris Nikolaou (D.P.H.): mastering

Mike Nikolatos: styling

Credits adapted from the album's liner notes.

References

1990 albums
Katy Garbi albums
Greek-language albums
Sony Music Greece albums